Kyler John Phillips (born June 12, 1995) is an American mixed martial artist who competes in the Bantamweight division of the Ultimate Fighting Championship.

Background

At the age of 3, Phillip's father took him to the Gracie Academy out of Torrance, California, where he developed a lifelong love for it. At the age of 12, Phillips took part in pankration fights and had his first MMA fight at the age of 16. Phillips also wrestled at Temecula Valley High School. He is a Carlson Gracie BJJ Brown belt, and a Nikidokai black/red belt under grandmaster Hanshi Nico. Among some other accomplishments of Phillips are IBJJF jiu-jitsu world champion blue belt (2012), California State judo champion (2010), and California Southern Section CIF wrestling champion at 138 lbs (2013).

Mixed martial arts career

Early career

After a 4–0 record on the regional scene, including an impressive win at LFA 13 against Jonathan Quiroz, was invited to first season of Dana White's Contender Series 4 in 2017, when he only needed 46 seconds to stop James Gray Jr. While not being offered a contract to the UFC, he was brought in to compete on The Ultimate Fighter: Undefeated.

On the show he lost a majority decision to eventual season winner Brad Katona. Then came his first official pro defeat, a split decision to Victor Henry in a 2018 bout before a head kick knockout of Emeka Ifekandu in 2019 earned him his call to the Octagon.

Ultimate Fighting Championship

Phillips made his UFC debut against Gabriel Silva on February 29, 2020, at UFC Fight Night: Benavidez vs. Figueiredo. He won the bout in dominant fashion via unanimous decision. This win earned him the Fight of the Night bonus.

Phillips faced Cameron Else on October 4, 2020, at UFC on ESPN: Holm vs. Aldana. He won the bout via stoppage due to elbows on the ground in the second round. This win earned him the Performance of the Night bonus.

Phillips faced Yadong Song on March 6, 2021, at UFC 259. He won the bout via unanimous decision.

Phillips was scheduled to face Raphael Assunção on July 24, 2021, at UFC on ESPN: Sandhagen vs. Dillashaw. However, Assunção suffered a biceps injury in late June and was replaced by Raulian Paiva. Phillips lost the fight via majority decision. This fight earned him the Fight of the Night award.

Phillips faced Marcelo Rojo on February 12, 2022, at UFC 271. He won the fight via triangle armbar submission in round three.

Phillips was scheduled to face Jack Shore  on November 19, 2022 at UFC Fight Night 215. However, Shore pulled out of the fight due to a knee injury. 

Phillips was scheduled to face Raphael Assunção on March 11, 2023 at UFC Fight Night 221. However, Phillips withdrew from the event for undisclosed reasons, and he was replaced by Davey Grant.

Championships and achievements

Mixed martial arts
 Ultimate Fighting Championship
Performance of the Night (One time) 
Fight of the Night (Two times)

Mixed martial arts record

|-
|Win
|align=center|10–2
|Marcelo Rojo
|Submission (triangle armbar)
|UFC 271
|
|align=center|3
|align=center|1:48
|Houston, Texas, United States
|
|-
|Loss
|align=center|9–2
|Raulian Paiva
|Decision (majority)
|UFC on ESPN: Sandhagen vs. Dillashaw 
|
|align=center|3
|align=center|5:00
|Las Vegas, Nevada, United States
|.
|-
|Win
|align=center|9–1
|Song Yadong
|Decision (unanimous)
|UFC 259
|
|align=center|3
|align=center|5:00
|Las Vegas, Nevada, United States
|
|-
|Win
|align=center|8–1
|Cameron Else
|TKO (elbows)
|UFC on ESPN: Holm vs. Aldana
|
|align=center|2
|align=center|0:44
|Abu Dhabi, United Arab Emirates
|
|-
|Win
|align=center|7–1
|Gabriel Silva
|Decision (unanimous)
|UFC Fight Night: Benavidez vs. Figueiredo
|
|align=center|3
|align=center|5:00
|Norfolk, Virginia, United States
|
|-
|Win
|align=center|6–1
|Emeka Ifekandu
|KO (head kick)
|LFA 59
|
|align=center|1
|align=center|2:30
|Phoenix, Arizona, United States
| 
|-
|Loss
|align=center| 5–1
|Victor Henry
|Decision (split)
|CXF 15: Rage in the Cage
|
|align=Center|3
|align=center|5:00
|Burbank, California, United States
| 
|-
|Win
|align=center|5–0
|James Gray
|TKO (elbows and punches)
|Dana White's Contender Series 4
|
|align=center|1
|align=center|0:46
|Las Vegas, Nevada, United States
|
|-
|Win
|align=center|4–0
|Jonathan Quiroz
|Decision (unanimous)
|LFA 13
|
|align=center|3
|align=center|5:00
|Burbank, California, United States
| 
|-
|Win
|align=center|3–0
|George Garcia
|TKO (punches)
|CXF 5: Night of Champions
|
|align=center|1
|align=center|2:55
|Studio City, California, United States
| 
|-
|Win
|align=center|2–0
|PJ Ste-Marie
|Submission (calf slicer)
|CXF 4: Fighting for Liam
|
|align=center|1
|align=center|4:37
|Studio City, California, United States
|
|-
|Win
|align=center|1–0
|Taylor Alfaro
|TKO (punches)
|CXF 1: The Return
|
|align=center|1
|align=center|2:30
|Studio City, California, United States
|

See also 
 List of current UFC fighters
 List of male mixed martial artists

References

External links 
  
 

Living people
Bantamweight mixed martial artists
Mixed martial artists utilizing pankration
Mixed martial artists utilizing wrestling
Mixed martial artists utilizing judo
Mixed martial artists utilizing Brazilian jiu-jitsu
1995 births
American male mixed martial artists
Ultimate Fighting Championship male fighters
American male judoka
American male sport wrestlers
Amateur wrestlers
American practitioners of Brazilian jiu-jitsu